Benoit Robichaud is a Canadian politician. He represented the electoral district of Yarmouth in the Nova Scotia House of Assembly from 1967 to 1970. He was a member of the Progressive Conservative Party of Nova Scotia.

Robichaud is a retired optometrist in Yarmouth, Nova Scotia. He entered provincial politics in the 1967 election, winning the dual-member Yarmouth riding with Progressive Conservative George A. Snow. In the 1970 election, Robichaud was defeated when Snow finished 33 votes ahead of him to win the second seat, with Liberal Fraser Mooney winning the first. Robichaud ran again in the 1981 election, but lost to Mooney by 479 votes.

References

Living people
Progressive Conservative Association of Nova Scotia MLAs
People from Yarmouth, Nova Scotia
Year of birth missing (living people)
Acadian people